The Heiban Nuba are a people of the Nuba Mountains in South Kordofan state, in southern Sudan.

There are less than 50,000 Heiban, many of whom are Christian.

Language
The Heiban languages belong to Kordofanian languages group, of the Nuba Mountains, which is in the major family of Niger–Congo languages.

See also
Nuba peoples
Index: Nuba peoples

References
Joshua Project

Nuba peoples
Ethnic groups in Sudan